Michal Šalomoun (born 21 October 1974) is a Czech lawyer and politician who has served as Czech Minister of Legislation and chairman of the Government Legislative Council in Petr Fiala's Cabinet since December 2021, nominated by the Czech Pirate Party.

References

1974 births
Living people
People from Třebíč
Government ministers of the Czech Republic
Czech Pirate Party Government Ministers
21st-century Czech lawyers
Masaryk University alumni
Janáček Academy of Music and Performing Arts alumni